Crazy Clark's Discount Variety Store was an Australian company that operated over 150 discount variety stores in its chain, across Queensland, New South Wales, Northern Territory and Western Australia. The company also owned and operated a chain store called Go-Lo.

About 
Crazy Clark's sold clothing, cosmetics, toys, homewares, electronics goods, gardenware, confectionery and more. Crazy Clark's was the worldwide trademark owner of the Crazy Clark's logo and name with respect to retail stores. It was a subsidiary of the Discount Superstores Group.

Crazy Clarks went into voluntary administration on 1 July 2014, eventually closing all stores in August 2014.

References

2014 disestablishments in Australia
Companies based in Sydney
Retail companies disestablished in 2014
Defunct retail companies of Australia
Discount stores of Australia